140th Street station may refer to:
 140th Street station (MVTA), a bus rapid transit station in Minneapolis
 140th Street (IRT Ninth Avenue Line), a demolished elevated railway station in New York City